St. Andrews (alias Ballyhalbert) is a civil parish in County Down, Northern Ireland. It is situated in the historic barony of Ards Upper.

Settlements
The civil parish contains the following village:
Ballyhalbert
Portavogie

Townlands
The civil parish contains the following townlands:

Ballyesborough
Ballyfrench
Ballygraffan
Ballyhalbert
Ballyhemlin
Burial Island
Echlinville
Green Island
Portavogie
Roddans

See also
List of civil parishes of County Down

References